Novi Sad Pride is a pride parade held in Novi Sad, second largest city in Serbia and administrative center of Vojvodina organized to celebrate the lesbian, gay, bisexual, and transgender (LGBT) people and their allies. The event, attended by city officials and members of diplomatic missions in Serbia, was organized for the first time in May 2019 at the central Republic Square. Attended by around 200 people, 2019 pride was the first ever gay parade in Serbia to be held outside of Belgrade. The first pride was organized as the end event of the Pride Week in Novi Sad. It was organized on the International Day Against Homophobia, Transphobia and Biphobia.

History
Local organization COME OUT was established in 2010 and it received its official office space in the city as a part of the 2019 Novi Sad European Youth Capital project with an aim to organize the first ever big scale Pride Parade by 2020. However, it was never organized.

See also
 LGBT rights in Serbia
 Recognition of same-sex unions in Serbia
 LGBT history in Yugoslavia
 Belgrade Pride
 Osijek Pride

References

LGBT rights in Serbia
Pride parades in Serbia
Events in Novi Sad